Gabri, sometimes disambiguated from related languages also called "Gabri" as Southern Gabri, is an East Chadic dialect cluster spoken in the Tandjilé Region of Chad. The principal varieties are Buruwa, Darbe (Dormon), and Moonde.

References

Languages of Chad
East Chadic languages